In politics, a red flag is predominantly a symbol of socialism, communism, Marxism, trade unions, left-wing politics, and anarchism. It has been associated with left-wing politics since the French Revolution (1789–1799).<ref name="Brink">Brink, Jan ten [https://www.amazon.com/dp/1402138296 Robespierre and the Red Terror], (1899).</ref>

Socialists adopted the symbol during the Revolutions of 1848 and it became a symbol of communism as a result of its use by the Paris Commune of 1871. The flags of several socialist states, including China, Vietnam and former Soviet Union, are explicitly based on the original red flag. The red flag is also used as a symbol by some democratic socialists and social democrats, for example the League of Social Democrats of Hong Kong, the French Socialist Party and the Social Democratic Party of Germany. The Labour Party in Britain used it until the late 1980s. It was the inspiration for the socialist anthem, The Red Flag.

Prior to the French Revolution and in some contexts even today, red flags or banners were seen as a symbol of defiance and battle.

History

Red color as a combat or revolt symbol in Europe goes back to the turn of the millennia and before. In the Middle Ages, ships in combat flew a long red streamer, called the Baucans, to signify a fight to the death.

The red cap was a symbol of popular revolt in France going back to the Jacquerie of 1358. The color red became associated with patriotism early in the French Revolution due to the popularity of the Tricolour cockade, introduced in July 1789, and the Phrygian cap, introduced in May 1790. A red flag was raised over the Champ-de-Mars in Paris on July 17, 1791, by Lafayette, commander of the National Guard, as a symbol of martial law, warning rioters to disperse. As many as fifty anti-royalist protesters were killed in the fighting that followed.

Inverting the original symbolism, the Jacobins protested this action by flying a red flag to honor the "martyrs' blood" of those who had been killed. They created their own red flags to declare "the martial law of the people against the revolt of the court."

British sailors mutinied near the mouth of the River Thames in 1797 and hoisted a red flag on several ships.

Two red flags soaked in calf's blood were flown by marchers in South Wales during the Merthyr Rising of 1831. It is claimed to be the first time that the red flag was waved as a banner of workers' power. The red flags of Merthyr became a potent relic following the execution of early trade unionist Dic Penderyn (Richard Lewis) in August 1831, despite a public campaign to pardon him.

During the Mexican siege of the Alamo in March 1836, General Antonio Lopez de Santa Ana displayed a plain red flag (approx. 10 feet square) from the highest church tower in Bejar.  The meaning of this display – directed to the Alamo defenders – meant "no surrender; no clemency." 

At much the same time, the Liberal "Colorados" in the Uruguayan Civil War used red flags. This prolonged struggle at the time got considerable attention and sympathy from liberals and revolutionaries in Europe, and it was in this war that Garibaldi first made a name for himself and that he was inspired to have his troops wear the famous Red Shirts.

The Ottoman Empire used a variety of flags, especially as naval ensigns, during its history. The star and crescent came into use in the second half of the 18th century. A  (decree) from 1793 required that the ships of the Ottoman Navy were to use a red flag with the star and crescent in white. In 1844, a version of this flag, with a five-pointed star, was officially adopted as the Ottoman national flag.

In 1870, following the stunning defeat of the French Army by the Germans in the Franco-Prussian War, French workers and socialist revolutionaries seized Paris and created the Paris Commune. The Commune lasted for two months before it was crushed by the French Army, with much bloodshed. The original red banners of the Commune became icons of the socialist revolution; in 1921 members of the French Communist Party came to Moscow and presented the new Soviet government with one of the original Commune banners; it was placed (and is still in place) in the tomb of Vladimir Lenin, next to his open coffin.

With the victory of the Bolsheviks in the Russian Revolution of 1917, the red flag, with a hammer to symbolize the workers and sickle to symbolize peasants, became the official flag of Russia, and, in 1923, of the Soviet Union. It remained so until the breakup of the Soviet Union in 1991.

After the Chinese Communist Party (CCP) came to power in 1949, the flag of China became a red flag with a large star symbolizing the CCP, and smaller stars symbolizing workers, peasants, the urban middle class and rural middle class. The flag of the CCP became a red banner with a hammer and sickle, similar to that on the Soviet flag. In the 1950s and 1960s, other Communist governments such as Vietnam and Laos also adopted red flags. Some Communist countries, such as Cuba, chose to keep their old flags; and other countries used red flags which had nothing to do with Communism or socialism; the red flag of Nepal, for instance, represents the national flower.

Eastern Arabia tribal federations used a Red standard as their flag. These federations later developed into sheikhdoms and emirates. The red standard is adopted as one of the early Islamic flags which included a red standard such as the prominent Arab military commander 'Amr ibn al-'As who used a red banner. Examples of Arabian red standards include the flag of the Sultanate of Muscat and Oman, the individual flags of the emirates of the United Arab Emirates, the original flag of Kuwait, Bahrain, and Qatar.

 Symbol of communism and socialism 
During the 1848 Revolution in France, Socialists and radical republicans demanded that the red flag be adopted as France's national flag. Led by poet-politician Alphonse de Lamartine, the government rejected the demand: "[T]he red flag that you have brought back here has done nothing but being trailed around the Champ-de-Mars in the people's blood in [17]91 and [17]93, whereas the Tricolore flag went round the world along with the name, the glory and the liberty of the homeland!"

The banner of the Paris Commune of 1871 was red and it was at this time that the red flag became a symbol of socialism and communism.  The flag was flown by anarchists at a May Day rally for an eight-hour workday in Chicago in 1886. A bomb blast killed a policeman and the Haymarket Eight were arrested and five were executed. This event, considered the beginning of the revival of the international labor movement, is still commemorated annually in many countries (although not in the U.S.A.). The red flag gained great popularity during the Russian Revolution of 1917. The Soviet flag, with a hammer, a sickle and a star on a red background, was adopted in 1923. Various communist and socialist newspapers have used the name The Red Flag. In China, both the Nationalist Party-led Republic of China and the Communist Party-led People's Republic of China use a red field for their flags, a reference to their revolutionary origins.

The building to have had a red flag flying for the longest period of time and to still have one is the Victorian Trades Hall in Melbourne, Australia. It is the world's oldest trade union building. The flag has been flying for over a century.

Usage by anarchists
Anarchists, as part of the socialist movement, also used red flag. The banner was one of the first anarchist symbols.

British Labour Party
The red flag was the emblem of the British Labour Party from its inception until the Labour Party Conference of 1986 when it was replaced by a red rose, itself a variant of the "Fist and Rose" then in wide use by left of center parties in Europe. The more floral red rose design has subsequently been adopted by a number of other socialist and social-democratic parties throughout Europe. Members of the party also sing the traditional anthem The Red Flag at the conclusion of the annual party conference. In February 2006 the Red Flag was sung in Parliament to mark the centenary of the Labour Party's founding. The flag was regularly flown above Sheffield Town Hall on May Day under David Blunkett's Labour administration of Sheffield during the 1980s.

Communist and socialist red flag as name or title

It has been common to find streets, buildings, businesses and product brands named after the Red Flag in nominally socialist countries as a result of recuperation. For example, a famous line of limousine cars manufactured by China FAW Group Corporation has the brand name of Red Flag. In 1967 during the Cultural Revolution, Pilal in Akto County, Kizilsu, Xinjiang, China was renamed Hongqi Commune, meaning 'red flag commune'. In 1968, Baykurut Commune in Ulugqat County, Kizilsu, Xinjiang, China was also renamed Hongqi Commune.

Historical laws banning red flags
After the suppression of the 1848 revolution, the red flag and other insignia dominated by the colour red were banned in Prussia, as was the case in France after the demise of the Paris Commune. During the persecution of socialists during the Red Scare of 1919–1920 in the United States, many states passed laws forbidding the display of red flags, including Minnesota, South Dakota, Oklahoma, and California.  In Stromberg v. California, the United States Supreme Court held that such laws are unconstitutional.

In Australia the red flag was similarly banned in September 1918 under the War Precautions Act 1914''. This ban would be an arguable cause of the Red Flag riots. The ban ended in Australia with the repeal of the War Precautions Act in 1920.

See also

Bandiera Rossa
Black flag
Communist symbolism
Flag of Albania
Flag of Belarus
Flag of China
Flag of Hong Kong
Flag of Kyrgyzstan
Flag of Maldives
Flag of Mongolia
Flag of Montenegro
Flag of Morocco
Flag of North Macedonia
Flag of the Soviet Union
Flag of Switzerland
Flag of Tonga
Flag of Tunisia
Flag of Turkey
Flag of Vietnam
Green flag
Hammer and sickle (☭)
The Red Flag
Red flag in racing
Red flag warning
Red star (★)
The Standard of Revolt
White flag

References

External links

Auguste Blanqui, For the Red Flag, 1848.

Socialist symbols
Symbols of communism
Activism flags
Political flags
Flag (politics), red